Gosteli is a rare yet distinguished surname of Swiss origin. This surname's history can be traced back to as early as the 12th century where it was held by many nobles and people of great importance. Information on the Gosteli surname turns up randomly within the Swiss Confederation and throughout Switzerland's history. Due to the lack of record keeping in early times, most of the history is not well documented until the year 1500. One of the early Gosteli families listed is Jakob Gosteli, born around 1522 in Bolligen, Bern, Switzerland. His family consisted of wife, Christina Schmid, and 3 sons & 3 daughters: Martin, Michael, Niklaus, Barbli, Christine, and Barbel. Through canton and church records, many Gosteli family lines can be traced to this point.

Prior to the 1500s, the Gosteli name is found a List of Imperial Nobility of Switzerland for the Holy Roman Empire. The entry reads "Nobel House and Family of Gosteli. Nobel House of the Holy Roman Empire."

The Swiss origin of the Gosteli name lies within the Bolligen, Bern region of Switzerland. The ruins of Gosteli Castle were also located in this region along the road to Krauchthal, though its exact location is all but lost. Today the Gosteli surname is still primarily found in Switzerland but a few branches of the family line can also be found in areas of the United Kingdom, Canada, United States, and Latin America.

The Gosteli Coat of Arms is said to originate from the family's early arborist and farming days. The family line has a long history of connecting with the natural world and were often called upon for expertise in relating matters. Many of the early families held a preference for residing in forested hills and valleys within Switzerland, where they could farm cattle for cheese and milk. The Gosteli Coat of Arms for the municipality of Krauchthal features a castle.

Gosteli Ancestral Y-DNA 
The Gosteli surname is typically linked to the Haplogroup R-U152 (also known as Haplogroup R1b-S28), a R1b branch typically found throughout much of Western Europe. The R-U152 branch is often called the Italo-Celtic branch, due to its probable origins in the Alpine regions of Southern Europe during the Bronze and Iron Ages. The Alps were key to the European transition from the age of stone to the ages of metal - the valuable ores that lie deep within the mountains were intrinsically linked to the rise of the people often referred to as the ancient Celts. Cultures such as the Urnfield Culture, Hallstatt Culture, and La Tène Culture formed the basis for a series of mass migrations that saw Celtic culture exported as far as Britain in the north, and Anatolia in the east. Due to this, whilst R-U152 is most common today in Switzerland, North Italy and the regions geographically closest to the Alps, the R-U152 signature can also be found at a lower frequency across much of Western and Central Europe.

Notable Gosteli

Marthe Gosteli (1917–2017), Swiss suffrage activist and archivist

Surnames
Swiss noble families
Noble families of the Holy Roman Empire